The 1988 European Cup Winners' Cup Final was a football match contested between Mechelen of Belgium and the defending champions, Ajax of the Netherlands. It was the final match of the 1987–88 European Cup Winners' Cup and the 28th European Cup Winners' Cup final. The final was played at Stade de la Meinau in Strasbourg, France, on 11 May 1988. Mechelen won the match 1–0 thanks to a goal by Piet den Boer.

Route to the final

Match

Details

See also
1987–88 European Cup Winners' Cup
1988 European Cup Final
1988 UEFA Cup Final
AFC Ajax in European football

References

External links
UEFA Cup Winners' Cup results at Rec.Sport.Soccer Statistics Foundation
Match summary at Racingstub.com

3
International club association football competitions hosted by France
Cup Winners' Cup Final 1988
Cup Winners' Cup Final 1988
UEFA Cup Winners' Cup Finals
Euro
Euro
Sports competitions in Strasbourg
May 1988 sports events in Europe
20th century in Strasbourg